Myklebust may refer to:

Places
Myklebust, Bremanger, a village in Bremanger municipality, Sogn og Fjordane, Norway
Myklebust, Jølster, a village in Jølster municipality, Sogn og Fjordane, Norway
Myklebust Verft, a Norwegian shipyard located in Gursken in Møre og Romsdal, Norway
Myklebustbreen, a glacier in Sogn og Fjordane, Norway

People
Agnar Mykle (1915–1994), Norwegian writer (born Agnar Myklebust)
Anders Myklebust (born 1928), Norwegian politician
Christian Myklebust (born 1992), Norwegian football player
Egil Myklebust (born 1942), Norwegian businessperson and lawyer
Einar Myklebust (born 1922), Norwegian architect and professor
Magnus Myklebust (born 1985), Norwegian football player
Merete Myklebust (born 1973), Norwegian former football player
Oddmund Myklebust (1915–1972), Norwegian politician
Ole Jørn Myklebust (born 1977), Norwegian musician
Ragnhild Myklebust, Norwegian paralympian
Thor Myklebust (1908–1989), Norwegian politician
Gaute Myklebust
Bodil Myklebust

Other uses
Myklebust Ship, the remains of a burned Viking ship

See also
Mikkelbostad
Myklebostad (disambiguation)
Myklebost (disambiguation)